Ichiei (written: 一榮 or 市衛) is a masculine Japanese given name. Notable people with the name include:

, Japanese writer
, Japanese footballer

Japanese masculine given names